Parameswara Art Productions is an Indian film production company established by Bandla Ganesh in 2009. It is one of the biggest film production houses in South India and is one of the major production houses in the Telugu film industry.

History
Anjaneyulu was the first movie made under this banner. It starred Ravi Teja and Nayantara and was directed by Parasuram. It was released on 12 August 2009. Its pre-release revenue fetched an additional . Parameswara Arts' next flick Gabbar Singh turned to be an all-time industry hit by collecting  in 100 Days worldwide including all its versions. Its pre-release revenues fetched an additional . Later he made Allu Arjun starrer Iddaramyilatho. The film received mixed reviews but was a commercial hit collecting over  Gross.Bandla Ganesh already  produced Ram Charan’s new flick which was released in 2014.

Film production

Awards

References

External links
Bandla Ganesh on Twitter

Indian companies established in 2009
Film production companies based in Hyderabad, India
2009 establishments in Andhra Pradesh